Salih Delalić (21 July 1948 – 26 October 2002) was a Bosnian professional footballer, engineer and football administrator.

Club career
He started his professional career with his hometown side Slaven Živinice in 1966, before transferring to Sarajevo one year later. Delalić was a member of the first Sarajevo championship winning generation that clinched the Yugoslav First League title in the 1966–67 season and that was narrowly defeated by Manchester United in the second round of the 1967–68 European Cup. A 0–0 draw in the first leg at the Koševo City Stadium was followed by a 2–1 defeat in Manchester, yet Delalić made history by scoring Sarajevo's goal that night, becoming the first player from the former Yugoslavia to score at Old Trafford.

Personal life
After retiring from professional football, he enjoyed a successful career as an engineer. In 2001, Delalić was elected as the 27th President of the Assembly of his former club Sarajevo, a position he held on to until his sudden and unexpected death on 26 October 2002.

Death
Delalić died unexpectedly in his hometown of Sarajevo, Bosnia and Herzegovina on 26 October 2002, at the age of 54.

Honours

Player
Sarajevo
Yugoslav First League: 1966–67

References

1948 births
2002 deaths
People from Živinice
Association football midfielders
Yugoslav footballers
FK Sarajevo players
Yugoslav First League players
FK Sarajevo presidents of the assembly